Lee Hsiao-hung (born 11 February 1979 in Taipei) is a Taiwanese judoka, who competed in the women's heavyweight category. She picked up a total of thirteen medals in her career, including a silver from the 1998 Asian Games in Bangkok and a bronze in the openweight from the 2003 Summer Universiade in Jeju City, South Korea, and represented her nation Chinese Taipei in two editions of the Olympic Games (2000 and 2004).

Lee made her official debut at the 2000 Summer Olympics in Sydney, where she competed in the women's half-heavyweight class (78 kg). Lee opened her match with a more satisfying victory over Bulgaria's Tsvetana Bozhilova by an ippon, before she conceded with a shido penalty and thereby lost her next bout to Brazil's Priscila Marques because of the judges' decision (yusei gachi).

When South Korea hosted the 2002 Asian Games in Busan, Lee mounted her chances from a silver medal triumph in Bangkok four years earlier to pick up another one in the over-78 kg division, but slipped it away in a painful bronze medal defeat to Mongolia's Erdene-Ochiryn Dolgormaa by points on waza-ari. The following year, at the 2003 Summer Universiade in Jeju City, Lee ceased her medal drought to earn a bronze in the women's openweight.

At the 2004 Summer Olympics in Athens, Lee qualified for her second Chinese Taipei squad in the women's heavyweight class (+78 kg), by granting a re-allocated quota from the International Judo Federation. Unlike her previous Olympics, Lee sought revenge to thwart Dolgormaa on the tatami in the opening match since her bronze medal defeat from the Asian Games two years earlier, but she fell behind 2–1 on yuko against her opponent and never recovered until the five-minute bout ended.

References

External links
 
 
 

1979 births
Living people
Taiwanese female judoka
Olympic judoka of Taiwan
Judoka at the 2000 Summer Olympics
Judoka at the 2004 Summer Olympics
Judoka at the 1998 Asian Games
Judoka at the 2002 Asian Games
Asian Games medalists in judo
Sportspeople from Taipei
Asian Games silver medalists for Chinese Taipei
Medalists at the 1998 Asian Games
Universiade medalists in judo
Universiade bronze medalists for Chinese Taipei
Medalists at the 2003 Summer Universiade